Marko Vidović (born on 3 June 1988) is a Montenegrin footballer who plays as a left back.

Club career

Serbia
Born in Belgrade, SR Serbia, SFR Yugoslavia, Vidović started playing football in the youth teams of FK Partizan. After that, he spent two years with FK Hajduk Beograd until January 2008 where he made his first senior appearances playing in the Serbian First League (2nd tier).

Budućnost Podgorica
In 2008, he joined FK Budućnost Podgorica in the Montenegrin First League which was coached by Miodrag Ješić.  He was part of the squad that won the 2007–08 Montenegrin First League.  While playing in Montenegro, he accepted a call to represent Montenegro on international level, having played 5 matches for the Montenegro national under-21 football team.

Anorthosis Famagusta
In 2010 Vidović joined Anorthosis Famagusta coached by Slavoljub Muslin. He made his debut against PFC CSKA Moscow in 2010–11 UEFA Europa League playoffs.

Levski Sofia
On 28 January 2011, the official Anorthosis site announced that Vidovic will join Levski Sofia on 1 February. One day later he arrived in Sofia and successfully passed the medical tests.

Hungary
In the season 2012-13 he played in Hungary in top league sides Budapest Honvéd FC and Egri FC.

Spartak Subotica
On July 12, 2013, he was presented as a new player of FK Spartak Subotica along with Stefan Cicmil and signed the contract on July 30.

He played with FK Partizani Tirana in the 2015–16 Albanian Superliga.

In summer 2016 he returned to Serbia and joined second-level side FK Sinđelić Beograd.

Honours
Budućnost
Montenegrin First League: 2007–08

References

External links
 Profile at LevskiSofia.info
 

1988 births
Living people
Footballers from Belgrade
Serbian people of Montenegrin descent
Association football defenders
Serbian footballers
Montenegrin footballers
Montenegro under-21 international footballers
FK Hajduk Beograd players
FK Budućnost Podgorica players
Anorthosis Famagusta F.C. players
PFC Levski Sofia players
Budapest Honvéd FC players
Egri FC players
FK Spartak Subotica players
FC Tiraspol players
FK Partizani Tirana players
FK Sinđelić Beograd players
OFK Bačka players
SC Schiltigheim players
FK Sloga Kraljevo players
OFK Žarkovo players
Serbian First League players
Montenegrin First League players
Cypriot First Division players
First Professional Football League (Bulgaria) players
Nemzeti Bajnokság I players
Serbian SuperLiga players
Moldovan Super Liga players
Kategoria Superiore players
Championnat National 2 players
Montenegrin expatriate footballers
Expatriate footballers in Cyprus
Montenegrin expatriate sportspeople in Cyprus
Expatriate footballers in Bulgaria
Montenegrin expatriate sportspeople in Bulgaria
Expatriate footballers in Hungary
Montenegrin expatriate sportspeople in Hungary
Expatriate footballers in Moldova
Montenegrin expatriate sportspeople in Moldova
Expatriate footballers in Albania
Montenegrin expatriate sportspeople in Albania
Expatriate footballers in France
Montenegrin expatriate sportspeople in France